Openfilm was a website for finding and distributing independent film. Its advisory board included members of the film industry, such as James Caan, Robert Duvall, Scott Caan and Mark Rydell, and independent filmmaker Alan Melikdjanian.

The site was named "Best Online Video Sharing Site" by Videomaker Magazine in their 2008 "Best Products of the Year" feature.

Openfilm closed in August 2015.

References

External links
 Archive of openfilm.com shortly before its closure.
    “50 Best Websites for Moviemakers 2009”, MovieMaker.
 “Openfilm Offers Film Lovers and Filmmakers a Place to Shine”, Mashable.

American film websites
Former video hosting services
Internet properties established in 2008
Internet properties disestablished in 2015